Alexander Alexandrovich Zavyalov (born 2 June 1955) is a former Soviet/Russian cross-country skier who competed in the early 1980s, training at Armed Forces sports society. He won a bronze in the 50 km at the 1980 Winter Olympics in Lake Placid, New York and two silvers at the 1984 Winter Olympics in Sarajevo (30 km, 4 × 10 km relay). Zavyalov won the Cross-Country World Cup in the 1982–83 season.

Zavyalov also won two medals at the 1982 FIS Nordic World Ski Championships with a gold in the 4 × 10 km relay (tied with Oddvar Brå) and a silver in the 15 km.

Zavyalov graduated from Smolensk Institute of Physical Culture (1978). He was awarded Order of Lenin in 1983.

Cross-country skiing results
All results are sourced from the International Ski Federation (FIS).

Olympic Games
 3 medals – (2 silver, 1 bronze)

World Championships
2 medals – (1 gold, 1 silver)

World Cup

Season titles
 1 title – (1 overall)

Season standings

Individual podiums
3 victories 
6 podiums

Team podiums

1 victory 
2 podiums 

Note:  Until the 1999 World Championships and the 1994 Winter Olympics, World Championship and Olympic races were included in the World Cup scoring system.

References

External links
 
 

Olympic cross-country skiers of the Soviet Union
Soviet male cross-country skiers
Russian male cross-country skiers
1955 births
Cross-country skiers at the 1980 Winter Olympics
Cross-country skiers at the 1984 Winter Olympics
Living people
Olympic silver medalists for the Soviet Union
Olympic bronze medalists for the Soviet Union
Olympic medalists in cross-country skiing
FIS Nordic World Ski Championships medalists in cross-country skiing
FIS Cross-Country World Cup champions
Medalists at the 1984 Winter Olympics
Medalists at the 1980 Winter Olympics
Universiade medalists in cross-country skiing
Universiade gold medalists for the Soviet Union
Competitors at the 1978 Winter Universiade